Poolacode  is a village in Kozhikode district in the state of Kerala, India.

Demographics
 India census, Poolacode had a population of 28,411 with 14,867 males and 13,544 females.

References

Villages in Kozhikode district
Kozhikode east